Spahn may refer to:

People
Andy Spahn, American political consultant and fundraiser
Carl Spahn (1863–1943), Swiss politician
Claus Spahn (born 1940), director of cultural television programs at the German company WDR
Dieterich Spahn (born 1938), German-born American artist
Jens Spahn (born 1980), German politician and Federal Minister of Health
George Spahn (1889–1974), rancher who owned the Spahn Ranch near Chatsworth, Los Angeles, California, US
Helen May Spahn (1867–1957), American bandleader and composer
Helmut Spahn, FIFA security director
Moe Spahn, American basketball player
Paul Bernd Spahn (born 1939), emeritus professor of public finance at the Goethe University, Frankfurt, Germany
Peter Spahn (1846-1925), German politician (Centre Party)
Tom Spahn (born 1955), American composer
Warren Spahn (1921–2003), American baseball player

Other uses
Spahn Ranch,  ranch at 1200 Santa Susana Pass Road, Chatsworth, California
Spahn Ranch (band), electro-industrial group from Los Angeles
Spahn tax, a type of tax proposed by Paul Bernd Spahn
Warren Spahn Award, annual Baseball award given out by the Oklahoma Sports Museum

German-language surnames
Occupational surnames